Leo Williams, also known as E-Zee Kill, is an English-Jamaican bassist residing in the United Kingdom.

After a stint with the band Basement 5, Williams co-founded Big Audio Dynamite in 1984, a band led by Mick Jones, former lead guitarist, and co-lead vocalist of the Clash. Other BAD members included Don Letts, Greg Roberts and Dan Donovan.

After four studio albums together, the original BAD line-up broke up in 1989. Williams, together with Don Letts and drummer Greg Roberts, formed the band Screaming Target after Big Audio Dynamite's demise. Later, Williams joined Dreadzone, a group with his former bandmate Dan Donovan, and, again, Greg Roberts.

In March 2007, it was announced that—in addition to his work with Dreadzone, Williams would be a touring bassist for Carbon/Silicon, Mick Jones' latest musical endeavor. Williams appeared in the band's music video for "The News," and is featured as a band member on the official Carbon/Silicon website.

Williams rejoined the re-formed Big Audio Dynamite in 2011, which broke up again that same year.

Williams also featured in the science fiction action film The Fifth Element (1997) as the fuel loader of the Fhloston Paradise shuttle.

Discography

With Basement 5
 Peel Sessions (1980)
 Silicone Chip (1980, Island Records)
 The Last White Xmas (1980, Island Records)
 1965–1980 (L.P. 1980 Island Records)
 In Dub (L.P. 1980 Island Records)

With Big Audio Dynamite
This Is Big Audio Dynamite (1985)
No. 10, Upping St. (1986)
Tighten Up Vol. 88 (1988)
Megatop Phoenix (1989)

With Screaming Target
Hometown Hi-Fi (1991, Island Records)

With Dreadzone
 360° (1993, Tristar)
 Little Britain (1995, Virgin Records)
 Second Light (1995, Virgin Records)
 Zion Youth (1995, Virgin Records)
 Moving On (1997, Virgin Records)
 Biological Radio (1997, Virgin Records)
 The Radio 1 Sessions (2001, Strange Fruit)
 Sound  (2002)
 Once Upon a Time (2005)
 Live at Sunrise (2006)
 Eye on the Horizon (2010)
 Escapades (2013)
 Dread Times (2017)

References

External links
 Dreadzone – official website
 Carbon/Silicon official website
 
 
 

1959 births
Living people
English rock bass guitarists
English dance musicians
English hip hop musicians
Male bass guitarists
Big Audio Dynamite members
Black British rock musicians
Jamaican expatriates in the United Kingdom
English people of Jamaican descent
Jamaican musicians
People from Saint Andrew Parish, Jamaica
Carbon/Silicon members
Basement 5 members